In the area of mathematics known as differential topology, the disc theorem of  states that two embeddings of a closed k-disc into a connected n-manifold are ambient isotopic provided that if k = n the two embeddings are equioriented.

The disc theorem implies that the connected sum of smooth oriented manifolds is well defined.

References

 

Differential topology
Theorems in differential topology